The Shire of Upper Murray was a local government area about  northeast of Melbourne, the state capital of Victoria, Australia.

History

Upper Murray originally existed as the Corryong Riding and part of the Murray Riding of the Shire of Towong, and was first incorporated as a shire on 1 October 1920.

On 18 November 1994, the Shire of Upper Murray was abolished, and along with the Shire of Tallangatta, was merged into the newly created Shire of Towong, restoring the original pre-1920 entity.

Ridings

The Shire of Upper Murray was divided into three ridings, each of which elected three councillors:
 Corryong Riding
 Cudgewa Riding
 Tintaldra Riding

Towns and localities
 Biggara
 Corryong*
 Cudgewa
 Staceys Bridge
 Tintaldra
 Towong

* Council seat.

Population

* Estimate in the 1958 Victorian Year Book.

References

External links
 Victorian Places - Upper Murray Shire

Upper Murray